The Canton of Villers-Bocage is a former canton situated in the department of Calvados and in the Lower Normandy region of northern France. It had 10,613 inhabitants (2012). It was disbanded following the French canton reorganisation which came into effect in March 2015.

Geography 
The canton was of Villers-Bocage organised around the commune of Villers-Bocage in the arrondissement of Caen. The canton comprised 22 communes.

See also
 Arrondissements of the Calvados department
 Cantons of the Calvados department
 Communes of the Calvados department

References

Villers-Bocage
2015 disestablishments in France
States and territories disestablished in 2015